The fibers of the oculomotor nerve arise from a nucleus in the midbrain, which lies in the gray substance of the floor of the cerebral aqueduct and extends in front of the aqueduct for a short distance into the floor of the third ventricle. From this nucleus the fibers pass forward through the tegmentum, the red nucleus, and the medial part of the substantia nigra, forming a series of curves with a lateral convexity, and emerge from the oculomotor sulcus on the medial side of the cerebral peduncle.

The nucleus of the oculomotor nerve does not consist of a continuous column of cells, but is broken up into a number of smaller nuclei, which are arranged in two groups, anterior and posterior. Those of the posterior group are six in number, five of which are symmetrical on the two sides of the middle line, while the sixth is centrally placed and is common to the nerves of both sides. The anterior group consists of two nuclei, an antero-medial and an antero-lateral.

The nucleus of the oculomotor nerve, considered from a physiological standpoint, can be subdivided into several smaller groups of cells, each group controlling a particular muscle.

A nearby nucleus, the Edinger-Westphal nucleus lies dorsal to the main oculomotor nucleus. It is responsible for the autonomic functions of the oculomotor nerve, including pupillary constriction and lens accommodation.

Additional images

External links
  - "Brainstem, Cranial Nerve Nuclei, Sagittal Section, Medial View"
 

Cranial nerve nuclei
Oculomotor nerve
Midbrain